John Birdsall may refer to:
John Birdsall (politician, born 1802) (1802–1839), American lawyer and politician from New York and Texas
John Birdsall (politician, born 1840) (1840–1891), American Union Army officer, lawyer and politician from New York